The 1837 Grand Liverpool Steeplechase was the second of three unofficial annual precursors of a Handicap Steeple-chase, later to become known as the Grand National Steeplechase horse race which took place at Aintree Racecourse near Liverpool on 4 March 1837 and attracted a field of four runners. This race did not carry the prestige of the future Grand Nationals and its status as an official Grand National was revoked some time between 1862 and 1873.

Competitors and betting
Four horses lined up for the start of the race for which starting prices are not recorded. The competitors were:

 Dan O'Connell, a 6-year-old ridden by Mr J Knaresborough
 The Disowned, a 6-year-old ridden by Alan McDonough
 The Duke, the 8-year-old winner of the 1836 Great Liverpool Steeplechase, ridden by Henry Potts
 Zanga, a 7-year-old ridden by John Devine, the only rider to have competed in the race the previous year.

The race

All four runners completed the first mile of the race without mishap before The Duke refused a fence beside the bridge over the Leeds and Liverpool Canal; he continued some way behind his three rivals. On the second circuit Dan O'Connell fell and brought down Zanga and The Disowned. While the three riders were attempting to regain their mounts to continue, The Duke came to, and cleared, the same fence, continuing on to secure a long lead. Victory for The Duke was certain after he cleared the final flight of hurdles and he was slowed to a mere trot long before passing the finishing post. The Disowned was remounted to finish second, twelve lengths behind, while Dan O'Connell finished a distance behind in third. Zanga ran loose and did not complete the course.

Finishing order

Non-finishers 

The race was won in a time of fourteen minutes, beating the previous year's time by five minutes and fifty seconds

Aftermath

The race would go on to be regarded as the second running of the Grand National until the mid-1860s when newspapers began omitting the race, and those of 1836 and 1838, from the records of previous winners. This in turn led to a popular, but incorrect, belief that the race was run over a course at Maghull and not Aintree, and became the official view held by Aintree when a board listing the winners of all previous Nationals was erected underneath the stands in 1894, stating that the races of 1837, and 1838 were run at Maghull. Although it is now widely acknowledged that the race was indeed run at Aintree, it is also the official view of Aintree that the races prior to 1839 should not be included as legitimate Grand Nationals and should be regarded more as precursors. As a result, The Duke is not listed in official publications as a dual winner of the race.

References

Grand National
 1837
Grand National
History of Liverpool
1830s in Liverpool
March 1837 sports events